Kafr Qasim, also spelled as Kafr Qassem, Kufur Kassem, Kfar Kassem and Kafar Kassem, is a hill-top city in Israel with an Arab population. The town was the site of the Kafr Qasim massacre, in which the Israel Border Police killed 49 civilians on October 29, 1956. On February 12, 2008, Israeli Minister of the Interior Meir Sheetrit declared Kafr Qasim a city in a ceremony held at the town.

History
The town's area was populated in ancient times, based on remains from the Middle Paleolithic period found in the Qesem Cave. Cisterns, a winepress and terraced fields have also been  documented, together with remains from the Byzantine era.

Ottoman Empire
In 1838, during the Ottoman period, it was noted as a Muslim village, Kefr Kasim, in Jurat Merda, south of Nablus.

Charles van de Velde visited the site in 1851–52, noting "the many ancient stones used in the construction of the present houses and many other remains indicating an ancient site."

In 1870 Victor Guérin visited the village, which he called Kafr Kasim. He found the place to be "the site of a more ancient town, as is shown by cisterns and the mass of rubbish found outside the present village". The village had about four hundred inhabitants.

In 1882, the PEF's Survey of Western Palestine described the village as being of moderate size, with buildings constructed principally of adobe, on low hill in open ground. The survey also noted the existence of a rock-cut tomb to the south of the village.

British Mandate
In 1917, during World War I, Kafr Qasim (together with the rest of the area) was captured from the ruling Ottoman Empire by the British Army and was later placed under the British Mandate of Palestine.

In the  1922 census of Palestine  Kufr Quasem had a population of 661, all Muslims,  increasing in the 1931 census to 989, still all Muslims, in a total of 241 houses.

In  1945  the population of Kafr Qasim was 1,460, all Muslims, who owned 12,765 dunams of land according to an official land and population survey. 239 dunams were for citrus and bananas, 491 were plantations and irrigable land, and 8,980 were planted with cereals, while 58 dunams were built-up (urban) land.

Israel

20th century

Israeli military advances came to a halt at Kafr Qasim during the 1948 Arab-Israeli War. In 1949, Israel annexed the town in accordance with the 1949 Armistice Agreements.

On October 29, 1956, on the eve of the joint Israeli, French and British invasion of Egypt, Israel moved up the time of the local curfew as it was concerned that nearby Jordan would enter the fighting.  After the curfew started, a platoon of Israeli border police who had been sent to the area encountered and killed 49 villagers returning to Kafr Qasim from their work in the fields. Though the village head had been informed a half an hour before the military curfew started, he informed the Israeli commander that the fellahin and shepherds could not be notified in time that the curfew had been imposed.  The incident became known as the Kafr Qasim massacre. In October 2021, the President of Israel Isaac Herzog made an official apology for the 1956 massacre, on behalf of the state.

In 1959, the town was granted local council status by the Israeli Interior Ministry.

21st century
Sheikh Abdullah Nimar Darwish started the Islamic Movement. Israeli parliamentarian Sheikh Ibrahim Sarsur, a native of Kafr Qasim, served for a decade on the town council and heads the southern faction of the Islamic Movement of Israel since 1999. In December 2007, President Shimon Peres formally apologised for the Kafr Qasim massacre.

In 2007 development plans for the industrial and logistical area Lev HaAretz were approved. Development started in 2008. Steimatzky is one of many companies who moved into this area. Also in 2008, the Ministry of the Interior announced that Kafr Qasim would become a city.

Demographics
According to the Israel Central Bureau of Statistics, the town had 21,100 mostly Muslim inhabitants at the end of 2012. There are 936 females for every 1,000 males. The population increases at an annual rate of 2.7%.

The social-economic rank of the town is relatively low (3 out of 10). Only 50.2% of 12th graders were eligible for graduation (Bagrut) certificates in 2000. The average monthly wage in 2000 was 3,633 NIS, as opposed to the national average of 6,835 NIS at that time.

Culture
Kafr Qasim served as the primary filming location for the Israeli political thriller television series Fauda.

Sports
F.C. Kafr Qasim plays in the Leumit League (second division). Following their promotion to the national league, it plays home matches at the Lod Municipal Stadium in Lod. A new stadium is under construction.

Notable people

Walid Badir, international footballer
Abdullah Nimar Darwish, founder of the Islamic Movement in Israel
Issawi Frej, Knesset member
Samah Mar'ab, international footballer
Rubel Sarsour, international footballer
Ibrahim Sarsur, Knesset member

See also
 Arab localities in Israel
 Kafr Qasem Sign Language

References

Bibliography

External links
 Kfar-Qasem municipality website
 Kufur-Kassem home page
 Kufur-Kassem official home page
Survey of Western Palestine, Map 14:    IAA, Wikimedia commons 
 the village location
 Material in English
 Material in Hebrew כפר קאסם בעברית
 Welcome To Kafr Qasem

Arab localities in Israel
Cities in Israel
Triangle (Israel)
Cities in Central District (Israel)